is a 2010 Japanese yakuza film directed by and starring Takeshi Kitano. It competed for the Palme d'Or at the 2010 Cannes Film Festival. It is followed by Beyond Outrage (2012) and Outrage Coda (2017).

Plot

The film begins with a sumptuous banquet at the opulent estate of the Grand Yakuza leader Sekiuchi (Soichiro Kitamura), boss of the Sanno-kai, a huge organized crime syndicate controlling the entire Kanto region. He has invited the many Yakuza leaders under his control. After the formal conclusion of the banquet, Kato, the chief lieutenant of Sekiuchi, pulls one of the Yakuza leaders, Ikemoto, aside and makes plain that he is displeased with the news that Ikemoto has become friendly with a rival gang leader, Murase, while the two were unexpectedly imprisoned together. Kato, underboss of the Sanno-kai, orders Ikemoto to bring the unassociated Murase-gumi gang in line, and Ikemoto immediately passes the task on to his subordinate Otomo (Beat Takeshi), who runs his own crew.

Shortly thereafter an incident occurs at a nightclub owned by Murase where a man posing as a customer is inadvertently put through a shakedown for about one million yen. It turns out that this is a member of the Otomo family who has been planted into the nightclub in order to help set-off the conditions for an all-out gang war against the Murase family. Murase, who is completely in the dark concerning his having fallen out of favor with Sekiuchi, tries to ameliorate the situation by relying on his former prison friendship with Ikemoto, not knowing that Ikemoto is under orders to terminate his gang. He accepts Ikemoto's advice several times not suspecting any ill-intentions from Ikemoto and each time he further weakens his strength, his resources and his crime family. In one incident, Otomo leaves vicious scars on the face of Kimura who is Murase's chief lieutenant.
	
When the dust finally settles from the escalated tensions, Ikemoto and Murase are killed, Otomo is in a maximum security prison, unexpectedly with Kimura, and is stabbed twice in a prison ambush by Kimura in the belly with a makeshift knife. The complex interactions in the film finally come full circle and the film ends with Kato secretly killing Sekiuchi and taking control as the new Grand Yakuza leader of the Sanno-kai organized crime syndicate.

Cast
 Takeshi Kitano (Beat Takeshi) as Otomo
 Kippei Shiina as Mizuno
 Ryo Kase as Ishihara
 Tomokazu Miura as Kato
 Jun Kunimura as Ikemoto
 Tetta Sugimoto as Ozawa
 Takashi Tsukamoto as Iizuka
 Eihi Shiina as Jun
 Hideo Nakano as Kimura
 Renji Ishibashi as Murase
 Fumiyo Kohinata as Detective Kataoka
 Soichiro Kitamura as Sekiuchi
 Yuka Itaya as Otomo's girlfriend
 Naoko Watanabe as Mizuno's girlfriend

Production
Following a string of more unconventional films with limited commercial success, Takeshi Kitano decided to make Outrage as a film with no other ambition than to be entertaining. He was reluctant to label it as a return to his roots but referred to yakuza films as "a genre for which I have talent". When writing the screenplay, Kitano started by inventing the ways in which characters would be killed in the film, and thereafter wrote a story that would go along with the violence. The film was produced by Office Kitano with Bandai Visual, TV Tokyo and Omnibus Japan. Per the producer's suggestion no actors who had appeared in earlier Kitano films were cast, with the director himself as an exception. It was shot in CinemaScope from 23 August to 23 October 2009. Filming locations included Kobe and Ibaraki Prefecture.

Release
The film premiered in competition at the 2010 Cannes Film Festival where it was screened on 17 May. The Japanese premiere followed on 12 June through a collaboration between Office Kitano and the Japanese subsidiary of Warner Bros. The film had a revenue of 1,597,856 dollars (146,363,610 yen) from 155 screens during the opening weekend, which made it the fourth highest-grossing film in Japan that week. As of 4 July 2010, Box Office Mojo reported a total revenue of 7,230,528 dollars (634,117,307 yen) in the domestic market.

Reception
Keith Phipps of The A.V. Club gave the film a "C", and Kevin Jagernauth of IndieWire gave the film a "C−" rating. Rob Nelson of Variety described the film as "a beautifully staged marvel that confidently reasserts Kitano's considerable cinematic gifts".

References

External links

  (US)
  
 
 

2010 films
2010 crime thriller films
2010s Japanese-language films
Japanese crime thriller films
Films directed by Takeshi Kitano
Yakuza films
Warner Bros. films
2010s Japanese films